The 2022 FIM Ice Speedway World Championship was the 56th edition of the FIM Individual Ice Racing World Championship season.

Martin Haarahiltunen of Sweden won the World Championship series to become world champion for the first time and the first Swedish rider to win individual gold in twenty years. He won the title by virtue of overtaking the championship leader and strong favourite Johann Weber in the final round. Haarahiltunen completed a six race maximum while Weber crashed and was injured.

The leading Russian riders competed in the first two rounds but were then banned following the Fédération Internationale de Motocyclisme restrictions imposed on Russian and Belarusian motorcycle riders, teams, officials, and competitions as a result of the 2022 Russian invasion of Ukraine.

In the first two rounds Russian athletes competed as a neutral competitors using the designation MFR (Motorcycle Federation of Russia), as the Court of Arbitration for Sport upheld a ban on Russia competing at World Championships. The ban was implemented by the World Anti-Doping Agency in response to state-sponsored doping program of Russian athletes.

Final Series

Classification

See also 
 2022 Ice Speedway of Nations

References

External links 
 Official website

Ice speedway competitions
World